WNEG (630 AM) is a radio station broadcasting a classic hits format. Licensed to Toccoa, Georgia, United States, the station is currently owned by the Georgia-Carolina Radiocasting Company.  On April 21, 2016, WNEG officially began broadcasting on 93.1 FM, which was also the station's 60th anniversary.

See also
WGTA (former sister station to WNEG radio)

External links

NEG